Every Scene Needs a Center is the fifth studio album from the indiepop band Tullycraft. Arguably, the band’s most ambitious album, Every Scene Needs A Center ranges from punky bursts to mid-tempo near-ballads. The band spent over a year working on the mini-epic album, splitting time between a professional recording studio and their own studio, recording entirely on analog tape. The album reached #29 on the CMJ Top 200 chart in 2007.

Track listing 
All tracks by Tullycraft except where noted.

"The Punks Are Writing Love Songs"
"Fangs on Bats"
"Georgette Plays a Goth"
"Bored to Hear Your Heart Still Breaks"
"Clique at Night Vandals"
"Dracula Screams of Tiger Style (Parts One & Two)"
"The Lonely Life of the UFO Researcher"
"A Cursed Miss Maybellene"
"If You Take Away the Make-Up (Then the Vampires They Will Die)"
"Misgiving"  (New Bad Things)
"The Neutron"
"One Essex Girl"
"The Secret History of Devil's Paw"
"We Know You're Cute, You Told Us"

Personnel
Tullycraft
 Sean Tollefson – vocals, bass
 Jeff Fell – drums, xylophone
 Chris Munford – guitar, keyboard, backing vocals
 Jenny Mears – vocals, backing vocals, tambourine
 Corianton Hale – lead guitar, backing vocals, melodica

Additional
 Kip Beelman & Chris Munford – recording, audio engineering, production
  Saundrah Humphrey – violin on "Dracula Screams Of Tiger Style Pt.1 & Pt.2"
  Evan Mosher – trumpet on "Bored To Hear Your Heart Still Breaks" & "The Secret History Of Devil's Paw"

References

External links
 Discogs . Every Scene Needs A Center.

2007 albums
Tullycraft albums